The 2013 Women's Junior African Volleyball Championship was held in Nigeria from  14 – 16 March 2013.

Teams
But later the first three teams withdrew and Algeria, Egypt and Nigeria are the only three teams participating. It will be a round-robin tournament between the three teams, with the winning team being the champions.

Round-Robin

Pool

|}

|}

Final standing

Women's African Volleyball Championship
Women's Junior African Volleyball Championship
International volleyball competitions hosted by Nigeria
Women's Junior African Volleyball Championshipa